Private James Flanagan (1833 – October 4, 1905) was a soldier who fought in the American Civil War. Flanagan received the United States' highest award for bravery during combat, the Medal of Honor, for his action at Nolensville, Tennessee on 15 February 1863. He was honored with the award on 11 September 1897.

Biography
Flannigan was born in Canada in 1833. He enlisted into the 2nd Minnesota Infantry. He died on 4 October 1905 and his remains are interred at the Saint Lawrence Cemetery in Louisville, New York.

Medal of Honor citation

See also

List of American Civil War Medal of Honor recipients: A–F

References

1833 births
1905 deaths
People of Minnesota in the American Civil War
Union Army officers
United States Army Medal of Honor recipients
American Civil War recipients of the Medal of Honor